Invercauld Castle is a country house situated in Royal Deeside near Braemar in Scotland. It is protected as a category A listed building, and the grounds are included in the Inventory of Gardens and Designed Landscapes in Scotland.

History
The Farquharson family settled in the area in the 14th century, and constructed a tower house in the 16th century. A vaulted basement within the present building dates from this time, although the tower house was remodelled in the late 17th century. Further alterations were made through the 18th and 19th centuries, and in 1875 the castle was extensively remodelled by John Thomas Wimperis in the Scots Baronial style. The house retains many Victorian furnishings and paintings.

References

External links
Invercauld Estate

Castles in Aberdeenshire
Category A listed buildings in Aberdeenshire
Inventory of Gardens and Designed Landscapes